The WNC Women's Championship was a women's professional wrestling championship owned by the Wrestling New Classic (WNC) promotion. The title was a spiritual successor to the Smash Diva Championship, the women's title of WNC's predecessor, Smash. The championship was first announced at a press conference on October 12, 2012, when it was announced that a single-elimination tournament to determine the inaugural champion would take place from October 26 to December 27. In storyline, the championship belt was donated to WNC by the final Smash Champion and WWE road agent Dave Finlay, who was also named the head of the WNC Championship Committee, which decides matches for the title.

Like most professional wrestling championships, the title was won as a result of a scripted match. There were five reigns shared among four wrestlers.

History

Championship tournament

On October 12, 2012, Tajiri, the founder of Wrestling New Classic (WNC), announced the creation of the WNC Women's Championship, with a six-woman single-elimination tournament starting on October 26 in Korakuen Hall. The six participants were announced as Kana, Syuri, Lin Byron, Makoto, Nagisa Nozaki and Jessica Love, a Finnish wrestler, who was born male, but underwent a sex reassignment surgery in 2011 to legally become female. The first round of the tournament was decided that same day by a random draw, conducted by Tajiri and WNC president Tsutomu Takashima, which resulted in Love and Nozaki getting byes directly to the semifinals. The first first round match took place on October 26 and saw Syuri defeat Lin Byron to advance to the semifinals against Jessica Love. The second first round match took place on November 26 and saw Kana defeat Makoto to advance to the semifinals against Nagisa Nozaki. In the semifinals two days later, Syuri defeated Jessica Love, while Nagisa Nozaki eliminated the inaugural Smash Diva Champion, Kana, setting up a final match between the two. On December 27, Syuri, the final Smash Diva Champion, defeated Nagisa Nozaki to become the inaugural WNC Women's Champion.

Retiring
On June 18, 2014, WNC announced that the promotion would be shutting down following June 26. Afterwards, six of the promotion's male wrestlers transferred over to Wrestle-1, while its female wrestlers remained affiliated with the Reina Joshi Puroresu promotion, with which WNC had had a working agreement since January 2014. Following WNC shutting down, the WNC Women's Championship went inactive, before being brought up at a Reina event on August 30. On September 3, it was announced that Syuri, the reigning WNC Women's Champion, would face another WNC original and former WNC Women's Champion Makoto on September 30 in a match, which will mark the end of the title. On September 30, Syuri successfully defended the title against Makoto, after which it was retired.

Title history

Combined reigns

See also
Wrestling New Classic
WNC Championship
Smash Diva Championship

References

External links
Wrestling New Classic's official website

Women's professional wrestling championships